A. E. Bizottság was a Hungarian underground band formed by a group of visual and multimedia artists and amateur musicians in the early 1980s. Their name translates as 'Albert Einstein Committee'. After their formation in 1980, they released one studio album and one soundtrack album before breaking up in 1985.

Discography
 1983 Kalandra fel
 1984 Jégkrémbalett, soundtrack of the film Jégkrémbalett
 1986 Amor Guru (compilation by Eksakt Records, NL)
 1993 Edd meg a fényt by László FeLugossy, Kokó, András Wahorn, István Szulovszky

References

Hungarian musical groups